Antônio Simões (born 10 February 1941) is a Brazilian equestrian. He competed in the individual jumping event at the 1972 Summer Olympics.

References

1941 births
Living people
Brazilian male equestrians
Olympic equestrians of Brazil
Equestrians at the 1972 Summer Olympics
Pan American Games medalists in equestrian
Pan American Games gold medalists for Brazil
Equestrians at the 1967 Pan American Games
Sportspeople from Rio de Janeiro (city)
Medalists at the 1967 Pan American Games
20th-century Brazilian people
21st-century Brazilian people